Borcová is a village and municipality in Turčianske Teplice District in the Žilina Region of northern central Slovakia.

History
In historical records the village was first mentioned in 1302.

Geography
The municipality lies at an altitude of 445 metres and covers an area of 2.094 km2. It has a population of about 126 people.

Genealogical resources

The records for genealogical research are available at the state archive "Statny Archiv in Bytca, Slovakia"

 Roman Catholic church records (births/marriages/deaths): 1690-1950 (parish B)

See also
 List of municipalities and towns in Slovakia

References

External links
Surnames of living people in Borcova

Villages and municipalities in Turčianske Teplice District